Przecław of Pogorzela (5 March 1310 – 6 April 1376 in Otmuchów) was a Cardinal of the Roman Catholic Church and Bishop of Wrocław and Duke of Nysa from 1342–1376.

Przecław of Pogorzela was born in 1310 into a noble family in the Duchy of Brześc. By April 1329 he was Canon of Wrocław. In 1336 he visited Bologna to study. On 5 May 1341, he was elected Bishop of Wrocław, but due to the opposition of the Archbishop of Gniezno, Janisław, he had to personally go to Avignon for Papal approval, which was confirmed on 28 January 1342.

A tireless builder, he oversaw the completion of Wroclaw Cathedral, built the Church of St. Stanislaus and Dorothy, the chapel of St. Mary's Church and Joseph's Hospital in Nysa. He also founded Carmelite, Carthusian, Augustinian and Benedictine monasteries.  He introduced the feast of St. Jadwiga and also had audiences with Emperor Charles IV of Luxembourg and King Casimir III the Great. In 1348, he purchased the castle of Jánský vrch from Bolko II of Świdnica, and turned it into the palace of the prince-bishops of Wrocław.

He died on the night of 5-6 April 1376 in Otmuchów, and was buried in the chapel of St. Mary's Church, Wrocław Cathedral, in a marble sarcophagus. His time has been considered a "golden age" of the bishopric of Wrocław.

Footnotes

References 
Przecław z Pogorzeli

Prince-Bishops of Breslau
14th-century Roman Catholic bishops in Poland
1310 births
1376 deaths
Burials at Wrocław Cathedral